Zachary Knight Rogers (born November 22, 1990) is a former American football wide receiver. He was signed by the New York Jets as an undrafted free agent in 2013. He played college football at Tennessee.

Early years 

He attended Lipscomb Academy in Nashville, Tennessee. He was selected to the Knoxville News-Sentinel's Top 20 Prospects in Tennessee list following his 2008 season in high school. He was selected twice to the All-State by Tennessee Football Coaches and Tennessee Sports Writers associations. He was selected as the Region 5-3A Player of the Year. He earned Middle Tennessee's National Football Foundation Scholar Athlete Award as senior in high school. He was selected to the first-team All-Region in junior season while helping his David Lipscomb High school football team to the Class 3A state championship. While at high school, he set school track and field records in six events.

College career 

In his Freshman season, he recorded 3 Receptions, 19 Receiving yards and no receiving touchdowns. He was selected to the 2009 SEC Freshman Academic Honor Roll. In his Sophomore season, 14 Receptions, 207 Receiving yards and one receiving touchdown. On July 19, 2010, he was named in the 2010 SEC Freshman Academic Honor Roll for the second consecutive season.  He also was named to the 2010 Academic All-SEC team. In his Junior season, 14 Receptions, 189 Receiving yards and one receiving touchdown. He was selected to the 2011 Academic All-SEC following his Junior season. In his Senior season, A Career-High 32 Receptions, Career-High 491 Receiving yards and 7 Receiving touchdowns.

Professional career 
On April 27, 2013, he signed with the New York Jets as an undrafted free agent following the 2013 NFL Draft. He was released on August 31, 2013.

References

External links 
Tennessee Volunteers bio

1990 births
Living people
Tennessee Volunteers football players
New York Jets players